Esa Erkki Piironen (born 25 October 1943 in Turku) is a Finnish architect. He studied architecture at Helsinki University of Technology, qualifying as an architect in 1970. He studied architecture and urban design in North Carolina State University in Raleigh, North Carolina, and was awarded the Master of Architecture in 1972. He was working as a teaching assistant at Helsinki University of Technology 1972–81, and was awarded Licentiate in Technology in 1978. Visiting professor at Guangdong University of Technology School of Art and Design starting from 2012.

Architectural career

During the study years Esa Piironen worked at the Architectural Office of Pekka Pitkänen in Turku 1959-1969 as a helping assistant for instance designing the Chapel of Holy Cross. Esa Piironen started private practice in 1966 with Mikko Pulkkinen in Turku. They designed mostly small private houses around Turku until 1971. In 1970 Esa Piironen established a new office called Suunnittelutoimisto G4 with Ola Laiho, Esko Miettinen and Juhani Pallasmaa. They designed sign systems for Helsinki Metro and State Railways and other institutes until 1985. In 1978 Esa Piironen established a new office with Sakari Aartelo. Their main work is Tampere Hall (a concert and congress hall for 2000 persons) based on a 1st prize competition entry. Tampere Hall was completed in 1990.

The office of Esa Piironen Architects was established in 1990. The firm has completed a wide variety of projects from small scale street furniture design to large scale urban design. Many realized projects are based on winning public competition entries. Esa Piironen Architects are working mostly with state and city municipalities but also with private companies and individuals. The firm has always practised environmentally responsible architecture. The practice has been characterised by a constant commitment to architecture based on a humanistic principle. One of the main works is Helsinki Railway Station Platform Roofing (2001) based on an international competition entry.

In 2007 Esa Piironen started cooperation with ALA Architects. Their main works are Aalto University (Otaniemi ) metrostation and Keilaniemi metrostation, which were completed in 2017.

The works of Esa Piironen Architects have been published in many distinguished architectural magazines around the world.

Esa Piironen has lectured on various subjects related to urban design, architecture, environmental design, graphic design, exhibition design, environmental psychology in Finland and abroad. In 2012 he was appointed as a visiting professor at Guangdong University of Technology School of Art and Design.

Works
A selection of  works by Esa Piironen:

Private House, Söörmarkku, 1966
Private swimming hall, Turku, 1967, P+P (demolished)
Villa Suojaranta, Merimasku 1968
Villa Vainiola, Aura, 1970
Villa Björköholmen, Pargas, annex, 1974
Pyhäjoki church, competition entry 1975
Helsinki metro, sign system, G4,1970–82
Finnish State Railways, sign system, G4, 1976–82
Kumpulan University Area, competition entry, A+P, 197
Pori music - and congress center, competition entry, A+P, 1981
Rautavaara Church 1982 A+P
The Official Residence of the President of Finland, competition entry, 1983
Hansasilta shopping mall and pedestrian bridge, Helsinki 1984 A+P
Laajasalo Church, Helsinki, competition entry, 1984
Botanical Garden and Glass House, Joensuu University 1985 A+P
Forest Research Center, Kannus 1985 A+P
Private House Koivikko 1985
Kurkimäki Multipurpose Hall, Helsinki 1989 A+P
Office building Rautio, Espoo 1990 A+P
Tampere Hall 1990 A+P
Viikki Triangle Cemetery, Helsinki 1990 A+P in collaboration with Leena Iisakkila
Bus shelter, Espoo, 1992
Kauhajoki School of Domestic Economics 1992
Seinäjoki railway station, pedestrian tunnel and platform shelters 1993
Hietaniemi cemetery, Helsinki, Lighting fixtures, 1993
Luuniemi Housing Area competition entry, 1993
Helsinki University metrostation (Kaisaniemi), platform hall, Helsinki 1995
Pikku-Huopalahti Multipurpose Hall, Helsinki 1997
Vuosaari metrostation 1998
Pori railway station, pedestrian tunnel and platform shelters 1998
Helsinki 2nd Training School, reparation and annex 1999
Korso railway station, Vantaa 2000
Helsinki railway station, platform roofing 2001
Pormestari pedestrian bridge, Pori 2001
Nöykkiölaakso school reparation and annex, Espoo 2001
Leppävaara exchange terminal, Espoo 2002
Noise barriers, Kannelmäki- Lassila, Helsinki, 2002
Rautaruukki Polska Technology Center, Zyrardow 2002
Bus route, Oulunkylä-Viikki, Helsinki, 2003
Mikael Agricola Church, renovation, Helsinki 2004
Aviapolis pedestrian bridge, Vantaa 2004
Koivukylä railway station, Vantaa 2004
Hiekkaharju railway station, Vantaa 2004
Kallio Municipal Offices, renovation, Helsinki 2004
Mikkola School, Vantaa 2005
Haarajoki railway station, Järvenpää 2006
Mäntsälä railway station 2006
Ruukki Factory, Kiev, Ukraina 2008
Ruukki Factory Bolintin Deal, Romania 2008
Leppävaara Church, renovation, Espoo 2009
Kouvola railway station, platform shelters and lifts 2010
Treehouse, Björköholmen, Pargas, 2011-
Tampere Hall renovation and annex 2017
Keilaniemi metrostation, Espoo 2017 ALA+ESA
Aalto University metrostation (Otaniemi), Espoo 2017 ALA+ESA

Architectural competitions
1st prizes:

Pyhäjoki Church 1975
Kumpula University Area, Helsinki 1978 A+P
Rautavaara Church 1979 A+P
Tampere Hall 1983 A+P
Laajasalo Church, Helsinki A+P 1984
Viikki Triangle Cemetery, Helsinki A+P 1990
Luuniemi Housing Area, Iisalmi 1995
Helsinki Railway Station platform roofing 1995
Pori Railway station, platform shelters and pedestrian tunnel 1996
Pormestari pedestrian bridge, Pori 2000
Mestaritunneli, highway tunnel, Espoo 2005

Other prizes, purchases and honorary mentions:

Lounaisrannikko Terraced Houses, Espoo, 3rd prize with others, 1968
Puolivälinkangas Church, Oulu, competition entry, 2nd prize 1971
Tampere Library, competition entry, purchase, A+P, 1978
Kouvola Cultural Center, competition entry, 2nd prize A+P, 1979
Iisalmi Library- and Cultural Centre, competition entry, 3rd prize, A+P, 1980
Pori Music- and Congress Hall, competition entry, 3rd prize, A+P, 1981
Rauma Town Hall, competition entry, purchase, A+P, 1981
Järvenpää Administrative and Cultural Centre, competition entry, purchase, A+P, 1981
The Official Residence of the President of Finland, Helsinki, 2nd prize A+P, 1983
Lamminpää cemetery and chapel, Tampere, invited competition, honorary mention. A+P, 1986	
Tikkurila Orthodox Church, Vantaa, competition entry, 3rd prize, 1991
Bus Shelter, Espoo, competition entry, 2nd prize, 1992
Västra Eriksberg, Housing Area, Gothenburg, competition entry honorary mention, with others, 1992
A type-kiosk for Helsinki, competition entry, 3rd prize, 1994
Embassy of Finland, Canberra, competition entry, honorary mention, 1997

Publications

Thoughts on Architecture, China Electric Power Press, Kiina, ed. together with Fang Hai ja Dongfang Tan, 2018
On Architecture, China Electric Power Press, Kiina, ed. together with Fang Hai ja Dongfang Tan, 2014
Helsingin metron opastusjärjestelmän suunnitteluohje, HKL, 2008
Steel Visions, TRY, Avain, Helsinki, ed. 2006
Arkkitehtuurista/On Architecture, Avain, Helsinki, 2006
Small Houses in Finland, Rakennustieto Oy, Helsinki, 2004
Monografia: Esa Piironen, Architect, China Architecture and Building Press, 2003
Steel Images, TRY, Tianjin University Press, Kiina, 2003
Katettu katu, HKR/Katuosasto, 2001
Steel Images, TRY, Rakennustieto Oy, Helsinki, ed. 2001
Teräs julkisessa rakentamisessa, TRY, Rakennustieto Oy, Helsinki, 1998, together with Risto Saarni
Kaupunkirata Helsinki-Huopalahti-Leppävaara, asemasuunnittelun ohjeet, Ratahallintokeskus, Helsinki, 1997
Tikkurilan joukkoliikennepysäkki, Vantaa, C5:1996, 1996
Helsingin keskustan terminaalien matkustajaninformaation kehittäminen, HKL et al., Helsinki, 1995
Helsinki Vantaan lentoaseman opastesuunnittelun perusteet, Helsinki, together with Viisikko Oy, 1994
Ulkomainonta kaupunkikuvassa, FEPE Finland, Helsinki, ed., 1983
VR, Opastusjärjestelrnä, Helsinki, 1982
Lars Sonck 1870–1956, Suomen rakennustaiteen museo, Helsinki, ed., 1981
Kurkimäen korttelitalo, Esisuunnitelma, HKR, Helsinki, A+P, 1980
Suomalaisia kytkettyjä pientaloja, TKK, Espoo, ed., 1980
Le Corbusier: Uutta arkkitehtuuria kohti (käännös), TKK, Espoo, ed., 1979
Matalaenergiataloja, TKK, Espoo, ed., 1978
Ympäristöpsykologia 5, TKK, Espoo, ed., 1978
Ympäristön havaitsemisesta ja sen mittaamisesta, TKK, Espoo, 1978
Suomalaisia yhdenperheentaloja, TKK, Espoo, ed., 1977
G4, imago, Helsinki, 1977
Sports and Leisure, Helsinki, ed., 1977
Ympäristöpsykologia 4, TKK, Espoo, ed., 1977
Ympäristöpsykologia 3, TKK, Espoo, ed., 1976
Suomalaisia loma-asuntoja ja saunoja, TKK, Espoo, ed., 1976
Helsingin metron opastus- ja informaatiojärjestelmä, yleissuunnitelma, G4, 1975
Ympäristöpsykologia 2, TKK, Espoo, ed., 1975
Metroasemien sisustuskomponentit, Helsinki, ed., with others, 1974
Lastentalon suunnittelun perusteet, TKK, Espoo, ed., 1974
Loma-asunnon suunnittelun perusteet, TKK, Espoo, ed., 1974
Ympäristöpsykologia 1, TKK, Espoo, ed., 1974
Metro/USA, Helsingin kaupungin metrotoimisto, 1974
TKK/A/100, Arkkitehtiosaston juhlajulkaisu, ed., 1974
Arkkitehtuuriopas Turku, Arkkitehti-lehti, 1972
Helsingin metron opastus- ja informaatiojärjestelmä, G4, 1972
Kadun kalusteet, Suomen rakennustaiteen museo, Helsinki, G4, 1970
Helsingin metron opastus- ja informaatiojärjestelmätutkimus, G4, 1970
Tutkimus seutu- ja yleiskaavamerkinnöistä, SAFA Asemakaava- ja standardisoimislaitos, Helsinki, 1970
Erik Bryggman 1891–1955, Turku, ed., 1967
Healing Architecture, China Electric Power Press, China 2021
Architecture and Materials, China Electric Power Press, China 2021

Quotes

In architecture, the spirit is more important than the material.
Transparency enables the illusion in architecture, which is part of the essence of architecture.
The purpose of architecture is to demonstrate the reality of gravity projected by light.
An architectural experience arises from the interaction of all the senses and memory.

Awards and grants

ASLA Fulbright, USA 1971-72
Lasse and Kate Björk Foundation grant 1973
Väinö Vähäkallio grant 1975
Greta and William Lehtinen Foundation grant 1978
Steel Construction Award 1986 A+P
Finland State Artist Grant 1999-2003
Brunel Award, UK, honorary mention 2001

Gallery of works

References

External links 
 

1943 births
Finnish architects
Living people
Finnish expatriates in the United States
Aalto University alumni
North Carolina State University alumni